FreakOut: Extreme Freeride is a sports video game developed by Swedish studio ColdWood Interactive and published by JoWooD Productions for PlayStation 2, released exclusively in Europe on March 30, 2007. The player controls one of six playable skiers from a third-person perspective using a combination of buttons to jump and perform tricks, and has to complete challenges to unlock new mountains and equipment.

FreakOut was announced on August 16, 2006, and released on PlayStation 2, Windows and PSP in 2007, before being made available worldwide on Steam on January 13, 2015. It received generally favorable reviews from critics.

Gameplay 
In FreakOut: Extreme Freeride, the player can control six different playable skiers. Each skier has his own "special tricks." The player must complete challenges to unlock new mountains and equipment. While winning challenges, the player also increases his tricks, balance, and endurance skills.

Multiplayer 
There are two different multi-player modes: "Splitscreen" and "Network." In the "Splitscreen" mode (which is not included in the PSP version), two players can race, either with a keyboard or joypad. However, in the "Network" mode, up to eight players can play together online. An online high score was also included, until the official FreakOut: Extreme Freeride website was taken down.

Players may initially choose from six skiing characters: three male and three female. Each character is of different age, comes from a different country and has their unique special tricks.

Reception 
Reviews for non-PC platforms were less favorable. In a review of the PSP version Dom Turner of AceGamez criticised the game for its "thin" polish and numerous flaws, noting that it "could have been a lot of fun," but that the game felt rushed and that "the flaws ruin the fun completely." In a PS2 review, Romendil of  JeuxVideo.com said that while the game is not "calamitous," it lacks any "hair-raising" sensations and that the gameplay is " classic and accessible", but "doesn't reach the ankles of games that inspired it, such as SXX." However, both reviewers noted that the music was the game's soundtrack was its strongest point.

Ross Scott in Ross's Game Dungeon gave the game favorable praise, claiming the game was a light in the dark for a time when no ski games were available for the PC.

References 

2007 video games
ColdWood Interactive games
Europe-exclusive video games
JoWooD Entertainment games
Multiplayer and single-player video games
PlayStation 2 games
PlayStation Portable games
Skiing video games
Video games developed in Sweden
Windows games